The chestnut-naped antpitta (Grallaria nuchalis) is a species of bird placed in the family Grallariidae.

It is found in Colombia, Ecuador, and far northwestern Peru. Its natural habitat is subtropical or tropical moist montane forests.

References

chestnut-naped antpitta
Birds of the Colombian Andes
Birds of the Ecuadorian Andes
chestnut-naped antpitta
chestnut-naped antpitta
Taxonomy articles created by Polbot